Alcohol-forming fatty acyl-CoA reductase (FAR (gene)) is an enzyme with systematic name long-chain acyl-CoA:NADPH reductase. This enzyme catalyses the following chemical reaction

 a long-chain acyl-CoA + 2 NADPH + 2 H+  a long-chain alcohol + 2 NADP+ + coenzyme A

The enzyme has been characterized from the plant Simmondsia chinensis.

References

External links 
 

EC 1.2.1